Ryan Gaul is an American actor, comedian and writer. He appeared on shows such as Showtime's House of Lies, Super Fun Night, Hart of Dixie, Hot in Cleveland, 2 Broke Girls, It's Always Sunny in Philadelphia, Superstore, Bajillion Dollar Propertie$, and The Last O.G.

Life and career
Gaul was born in Maine. He attended Lincoln Academy, of Newcastle, ME then Stonehill College, and worked at W.B. Mason before becoming an actor. He is a member of The Groundlings, an improv and sketch comedy troupe based in Los Angeles. A 2011 L.A. Times review noted his performance along with Charlotte Newhouse and Laurel Coppock as "a cappella singers who enthusiastically perform Toto's "Africa" even though they are missing six members of their group ("Throat Culture") and know only the background and percussion parts". He has starred on the Seeso series Bajillion Dollar Propertie$ and the TBS comedy The Last O.G.

Filmography

Film

Television

References

External links
 

Living people
American male television actors
Year of birth missing (living people)
Lincoln Academy (Maine) alumni
People from Damariscotta, Maine
Male actors from Maine